The 2023 ROKit F4 British Championship will be a multi-event, Formula 4 open-wheel single seater motor racing championship held across United Kingdom. The championship features a mix of professional motor racing teams and privately funded drivers, competing in Formula 4 cars that conform to the technical regulations for the championship. This, the ninth season, following on from the British Formula Ford Championship, will be the ninth year that the cars conform to the FIA's Formula 4 regulations. Part of the TOCA tour, it forms part of the extensive program of support categories built up around the BTCC centrepiece.

The season will commence on 22 April at Donington Park and will conclude on 8 October at Brands Hatch, utilising the Grand Prix circuit, after thirty races to be held at ten meetings, all but one in the support of the 2023 British Touring Car Championship.

Teams and drivers

Race calendar 
The provisional calendar was announced on 31 May 2022, with the revision published on 26 October 2022. All races will be held in the United Kingdom. All rounds are scheduled to support 2023 British Touring Car Championship, except for the round at Silverstone Circuit held together with British Endurance Championship.

Championship standings 

Points will be awarded to the top ten classified finishers in races 1 and 3 and for the top eight classified finishers in race 2. Race two, which has its grid formed by reversing the order of the ten best drivers from the qualifying session, awards extra points for positions gained from the drivers' respective starting positions. Bonus points count towards only the drivers' standings.

Notes

References

External links 

 

F4 British Championship seasons
British
F4
British F4
British F4